Black Heart is the debut studio album by British electronic duo Kish Mauve. It was released as a digital download on 30 March 2009 by YNYS Recordings. The album was recorded over three years and contains previously released material alongside new material.

Track listing 
All tracks were written and composed by Mima Stilwell and Jim Eliot, except where noted.

References

External links 
 Official Myspace

2009 debut albums
Albums produced by Jim Eliot
Kish Mauve albums